Asher Robbins (October 26, 1761February 25, 1845) (also known as Ashur Robbins) was a United States senator from Rhode Island.

Early life
Born in Wethersfield, Connecticut, he graduated from Yale College in 1782, was a tutor in Rhode Island College (now Brown University) from 1782 to 1790, studied law, was admitted to the bar in 1792 and began practice in Providence, Rhode Island.

Politics 
He moved to Newport in 1795, was appointed United States district attorney in 1812, and was a member of the Rhode Island Assembly from 1818 to 1825.

Robbins was elected as Adams (later Anti-Jacksonian and then Whig) to the U.S. Senate in 1825 to fill the vacancy caused by the resignation of James De Wolf; he was reelected in 1827 and 1833 and served from October 31, 1825, to March 3, 1839. While in the Senate, he was chairman of the Committee on Engrossed Bills (Twenty-second Congress).

Later life 
After his time in the Senate, Robbins was again a member of the State assembly (1840–1841) and was postmaster of Newport from 1841 until his death in that city in 1845; interment was in the Common Burial Ground. His daughter was the poetess Sophia Louise Little.

References

External links 

 
 A Statement of Some Leading Principles and Measures Adopted by General Jackson written by Robbins and others 
 

1761 births
1845 deaths
People from Wethersfield, Connecticut
People of colonial Connecticut
Rhode Island National Republicans
Rhode Island Whigs
National Republican Party United States senators from Rhode Island
Whig Party United States senators from Rhode Island
Members of the Rhode Island General Assembly
United States Attorneys for the District of Rhode Island
Rhode Island lawyers
Yale College alumni
Burials at Common Burying Ground and Island Cemetery
19th-century American lawyers
Rhode Island postmasters